Gregor Mohar (born 22 May 1985) is a former Slovenian footballer who played as a defender.

External links
Stats from Slovenia at PrvaLiga 

Living people
1985 births
Slovenian footballers
Association football defenders
NK Domžale players
NK Ivančna Gorica players
NK Zagorje players
Slovenian expatriate footballers
Expatriate footballers in Bosnia and Herzegovina
FK Sarajevo players
NK Radomlje players
Expatriate footballers in Iceland
Knattspyrnudeild Keflavík players
Slovenian Second League players
Slovenian PrvaLiga players
Premier League of Bosnia and Herzegovina players
Úrvalsdeild karla (football) players
Slovenian football managers
Slovenian expatriate sportspeople in Iceland